Konradów may refer to the following places in Poland:
Konradów, Greater Poland Voivodeship (west-central Poland)
Konradów, Łódź Voivodeship (central Poland)
Konradów, Lower Silesian Voivodeship (south-west Poland)
Konradów, Lublin Voivodeship (east Poland)
Konradów, Silesian Voivodeship (south Poland)
Konradów, Opole Voivodeship (south-west Poland)
Konradów, city district of Wałbrzych, Wałbrzych County in Lower Silesia